The Buoys may refer to:

 The Buoys (American band), a pop rock band
 The Buoys (Australian band), an alternative rock band

See also
 Boys (disambiguation)
 Buoy (disambiguation)